One of Her Own is a television film that aired on the US channel ABC on Monday May 16, 1994.

Plot
Rookie police officer Toni Stroud is raped by fellow officer Charlie Lloyd. When Stroud reports this to her superiors, she is fired from the force. She goes to the District Attorney, who files charges against Lloyd. Stroud, and her family, are subjected to harassment and vandalism from officers. The leadership of the force testifies that Stroud was fired as an inadequate officer, but also admit that they did not bother investigating Lloyd. The court case ends with Lloyd being found guilty.

Cast
 Lori Loughlin as Toni Stroud
 Greg Evigan as Charlie Lloyd
 Valerie Landsburg as Stacy Schoep
 Jeff Yagher as Heller
 Jason Schombing as Weisberg
 Reginald VelJohnson as Det. Bob Hymes
 Martin Sheen as Asst. D.A Pete Maresca
 Sage Cline as courtroom audience member

References

1994 television films
1994 films
American television films
Films directed by Armand Mastroianni
Films about rape